John McKay (born November 11, 1938) is an American pianist and music educator of Canadian birth. He has performed in concerts, recitals, and on radio and television broadcasts throughout North America and Europe. His programs often include works by contemporary American and Canadian composers, and he has performed the world premieres of works by Mortimer Barron, Clermont Pépin and Harry Somers among other composers. He has also performed extensively as a chamber musician and accompanist, including in performances with his wife, contralto Sara Hayden. In 1989 he co-founded the Minnesota Valley Sommarfest.

Life and career
Born in Montreal, McKay studied the piano with Lubka Kolessa in his native city as a boy. He graduated from the Schulich School of Music at McGill University with a Bachelor of Music in 1961. In 1962 he won the Prix d'Europe which enabled him to pursue studies in Vienna and Cologne with Bruno Seidlhofer and in Brussels with Stefan Askenase. In 1969 he joined the music faculties of both the University of Toronto and The Royal Conservatory of Music. He taught concurrently at those institutions until 1972 when was appointed head of the piano department at Dalhousie University. In 1971 he co-founded NOVA MUSIC, a Halifax-based organization dedicated to presenting new or seldom-performed music.

In 1974 McKay emigrated to the United States to pursue graduate studies at the Eastman School of Music at the University of Rochester. He earned a Doctor of Musical Arts from the school in 1979 after completing a doctoral thesis on notational practices in piano works by 20th-century composers. While pursuing these studies he began teaching on the music faculty at Gustavus Adolphus College in St. Peter, Minnesota in 1976, remaining there until 2004. He became a naturalized citizen of the United States in 1985.

References

1938 births
American classical pianists
Male classical pianists
American male pianists
American music educators
Canadian classical pianists
Canadian music educators
Academic staff of the Dalhousie University
Eastman School of Music alumni
Gustavus Adolphus College faculty
Living people
McGill University School of Music alumni
Academic staff of The Royal Conservatory of Music
Academic staff of the University of Toronto
20th-century American pianists